Sir Nalini Ranjan Chatterjee (died 6 September 1942) was a judge of the Calcutta High Court, India from 1910 to 1926 and officiated as Chief Justice on three occasions. He was knighted in the 1920 New Year Honours. He became a member of the Viceroy's Executive Council post retirement.

It was said of Chatterjee by then Chief Justice Rankin that not a single judgment of the former was set aside by the Privy Council.

Footnotes

1942 deaths
20th-century Bengalis
Brahmos
Judges of the Calcutta High Court
Knights Bachelor
Indian Knights Bachelor
Year of birth missing
20th-century Indian judges
Members of the Council of the Governor General of India